The triple pipes or Cumbrian pipes was a type of ancient Celtic-Viking musical instrument that is featured in recovered stone drawings made by English, Irish, and Scottish people during the 8th and the 9th centuries. However, there are no known physical artifacts that have been recovered of the triple pipes instrument.

See also
 Aulos
 Launeddas

References

External links
Triplepipe.net (supported by the Royal Scottish Academy of Music and Drama)

Scottish musical instruments
English musical instruments
Celtic musical instruments
Early Germanic music
Picts
Ancient music
Reconstructed musical instruments
Medieval musical instruments